"4, 3, 2, 1" is a song by Queens rapper LL Cool J featuring Method Man, Redman, Canibus and DMX from LL Cool J's seventh album Phenomenon as the second single. It was released on December 9, 1997, for Def Jam Recordings and was produced by LL Cool J and Erick Sermon. The single featured an extended version not featured on the album featuring an additional verse from Southern hip hop rapper Master P. Both the original song (without Canibus) and the extended cut (with Canibus and Master P) had accompanying music videos (directed by Diane Martel). The song peaked at number 75 on the Billboard Hot 100, number 10 on the Hot Rap Singles and number 24 Hot R&B/Hip-Hop Songs.

Controversy
The song is notable for starting the LL Cool J vs. Canibus feud, LL took offense to the lines, "L, is that a mic on your arm? Let me borrow that", which referenced his tattoo of a microphone on his arm – and which Canibus claimed was his own way of showing the rap veteran respect – and wrote an indirect diss to Canibus:

"The symbol on my arm is off limits to challengers / You hold the rusty sword, I swing the Excalibur"

And also:

"Now let's get back to this mic on my arm / If it ever left my side, it'll transform into a time bomb / You don't wanna borrow that, you wanna idolize / And you don't wanna make me mad, nigga, you wanna socialize."

Before the song was released, LL Cool J asked Canibus to change his lines. Canibus claims that LL Cool J vowed to modify his own lines as well, but the latter denied this and pointed out that nobody would know who he was talking about if only Canibus's line was changed. The original version eventually leaked, and fans started to piece the lines together. In 1998, Canibus would later respond to the diss with "Second Round K.O.". LL Cool J would then respond to that diss with the "Ripper Strikes Back". On his 2000 G.O.A.T. album, LL Cool J thanked Canibus for inspiration. In addition, despite appearing on the song, Canibus was omitted from the original music video for the song due to the feud, but was later included in the music video for the remix version.

Samples
This song features a vocal sample from LL Cool J's 1985 song "Rock the Bells" off LL's album "Radio". Another prominent sample featured in the song is from a The Beastie Boys song "(You Gotta) Fight for Your Right (To Party!)". And "Superrappin’" by Grandmaster Flash and The Furious 5.

Track listing

A-side
"4, 3, 2, 1" (Radio Edit)
"4, 3, 2, 1" (Regular Version)
"4, 3, 2, 1" (Instrumental)

B-side
"4, 3, 2, 1" (Radio Edit)
"4, 3, 2, 1" (Regular Version)
"4, 3, 2, 1" (A Cappella)

Charts

Weekly charts

Year-end charts

References

1997 singles
DMX (rapper) songs
LL Cool J songs
Master P songs
Method Man songs
Redman (rapper) songs
Song recordings produced by Erick Sermon
Songs written by LL Cool J
Def Jam Recordings singles
1997 songs
Songs written by Method Man
Songs written by DMX (rapper)
Songs written by Redman (rapper)
Hardcore hip hop songs
Posse cuts
Music videos directed by Diane Martel